Mikra (Míkra) is a former municipality in the Thessaloniki regional unit, Greece. Since the 2011 local government reform it is part of the municipality Thermi, of which it is a municipal unit. Population 18,145 (2011). The seat of the municipality was in Trilofo. The municipal unit has an area of 80.827 km2.

External links
Municipality of Mikra

References

Populated places in Thessaloniki (regional unit)